Agdistis symmetrica is a moth in the family Pterophoridae. It is known from the Malta and Tunisia.

The wingspan is about 20 mm.

References

Agdistinae
Taxa named by Hans Georg Amsel
Moths described in 1955